Raydel Corrales Poutou (born February 15, 1982) is a volleyball player from Cuba, who plays in different positions. He twice won a bronze medal with the Men's National Team in 2007.

References
 FIVB Profile

1982 births
Living people
Cuban men's volleyball players
Place of birth missing (living people)
Volleyball players at the 2003 Pan American Games
Volleyball players at the 2007 Pan American Games
Pan American Games silver medalists for Cuba
Pan American Games bronze medalists for Cuba
Pan American Games medalists in volleyball
Medalists at the 2003 Pan American Games
Medalists at the 2007 Pan American Games
21st-century Cuban people